Dino Delevski (born in Skopje, SR Macedonia, SFR Yugoslavia) is an American soccer player of Macedonian descent.

Club career
In 1996, Delevski graduated from Capitol Hill High School.  He was a 1996 All State High School soccer player at Capitol Hill.  He attended Oklahoma City University where he was a 1999 Second Team NAIA All American soccer player. On 25 January 2000, Delevski signed with the Wichita Wings of the National Professional Soccer League. During the 2000-2001 (final) season of the league, he made the National Conference team for the 2001 NPSL All-Star Game, held in Buffalo, New York (then home of the Buffalo Blizzard). On 20 August 2001, the Kansas City Comets selected Delevski in the first round of the dispersal draft. Delevski signed with the Comets.  He was selected as 2002 and 2003 NPSL MVP. During this time in Kansas City , Delevski started his youth coaching career in Kearney, Missouri. Delevski also was named the All-Star Game MVP in 2003, scoring a Hattrick during his exciting performance.  In 2003, he played outdoors with the Milwaukee Wave United of the A-League.  That year, he also became an American citizen. On 22 September 2005, the Philadelphia KiXX selected Delevski in the Dispersal Draft.  Delevski did not sign with the KiXX until 16 February 2006. He had stayed with the KiXX for the 2007-2008 MISL II season with fellow Macedonian Sandre Naumoski. Delevski was a valuable contributor to that team winning his first championship as the Philadelphia KiXX defeated the Detroit Ignition 13–8 to win the 2007 Major Indoor Soccer League title at Compuware Arena. Delevski then he would be traded to the Monterrey La Raza early in the season, where he immediately emerged as one of the League's leading scorers and leaders of the team.  In 2008, Delevski joined the Rockford Rampage of the National Indoor Soccer League.  On 25 February 2009, the Rampage released Delevski.  A week later, he signed with the Xtreme Soccer League which assigned him to the Milwaukee Wave. Delevski is currently a coach for the Chicago Inferno of the MASL.

Honors
 1996 Oklahoma High School All State
 1999 Second Team NAIA All American
 MISL MVP
 2002, 2003
 First Team All MISL
2002, 2003, 2008
 Second Team All MISL
2004, 2005

Notes

External links
 MISL Honors

1976 births
Living people
Footballers from Skopje
American people of Macedonian descent
Association football forwards
Macedonian footballers
Wichita Wings (NPSL) players
Kansas City Comets (2001–2005 MISL) players
Milwaukee Wave United players
Philadelphia KiXX (2001–2008 MISL) players
Monterrey La Raza players
Rockford Rampage players
Milwaukee Wave players
National Professional Soccer League (1984–2001) players
Xtreme Soccer League players
Major Indoor Soccer League (2008–2014) players
Macedonian expatriate footballers
Expatriate soccer players in the United States
Macedonian expatriate sportspeople in the United States
Sportspeople from Oklahoma City
Soccer players from Oklahoma
Oklahoma City Stars men's soccer players